Love Songs is a compilation album by British hard rock band Whitesnake, released on 6 November 2020 by Rhino Records. The album contains "revisited, remixed and remastered" versions of previously released songs, and is the second in a series called Red, White and Blues Trilogy following The Rock Album (2020).

Content
According to the album's executive producer David Coverdale, some songs "have been musically embellished where my co-producer Michael McIntyre, my new mixer Christopher Collier and I felt it appropriate or necessary to bring out the best in these songs."

Love Songs includes the previously unreleased songs "With All of My Heart", "Let's Talk It Over" and "Yours for the Asking" which features a music video, all originally recorded for David Coverdale's 2000 solo album Into the Light.

Track listing

Charts

References

2020 compilation albums
Whitesnake compilation albums
Rhino Records compilation albums